CBKA may refer to:

 CBKA-FM, a radio station (105.9 FM) licensed to La Ronge, Saskatchewan, Canada
 CBKA (AM), a radio rebroadcaster (1450 AM) licensed to Stewart, British Columbia, Canada